Senator Petersen may refer to:

Branden Petersen (born 1986), Minnesota State Senate
Chap Petersen (born 1968), Virginia State Senate
Frank S. Petersen (1922–2011), California State Senate
Janet Petersen (born 1970), Iowa State Senate
Lyndell Petersen (born 1931), South Dakota State Senate
Mike Petersen (politician) (born 1960), Kansas State Senate
Warren Petersen (fl. 2010s), Arizona State Senate

See also
Brittany Pettersen (born 1981), Colorado State Senate
Senator Pederson (disambiguation)
Senator Peterson (disambiguation)